Cigaritis lohita, the long-banded silverline, is a species of lycaenid or blue butterfly.

Description

The wingspan of Cigaritis lohita reaches .

Subspecies 
Cigaritis lohita lohita (Horsfield, 1829) - Java
Cigaritis lohita lazularia (Moore, 1881) - Sri Lanka, South India
Cigaritis lohita himalayanus (Moore, 1884) - India, Nepal, Bhutan, Assam, Sikkim to Burma, northern Thailand
Cigaritis lohita senama (Fruhstorfer, 1912) - Sumatra, Peninsular Malaya, Singapore, Langkawi, southern Thailand
Cigaritis lohita senama f. zebrinus Moore, 1884 - Sri Lanka
Cigaritis lohita batina (Fruhstorfer, 1912) - southern Vietnam, China: southern Yunnan
Cigaritis lohita panasa (Fruhstorfer, 1912) - northern Vietnam
Cigaritis lohita formosana (Moore, 1877) - Taiwan

Host plants
This species has been recorded on: Coffea liberica (Rubiaceae), Dioscorea species (Dioscoreaceae) Glochidion rubrum (Euphorbiaceae), Hiptage benghalensis (Malpighiaceae), Litchi species (Sapindaceae), Xylia species and Peltophorum species (Leguminosae) as well as on Psidium guajava (Myrtaceae).

Distribution
This species can be found in China, India, Bangladesh, Nepal, Bhutan, Myanmar, Thailand, Sumatra, Java, Peninsular Malaya and Vietnam.

References

lohita
Butterflies of Asia
Butterflies of Singapore
Butterflies of Indochina
Butterflies described in 1829